Erma or ERMA may refer to:

People
 Erma Bergmann (born 1924), All-American Girls Professional Baseball League pitcher and outfielder
 Erma Bombeck (1927–1996), American humorist and newspaper columnist
 Erma Franklin (1938–2002), American soul, rhythm and blues, and pop singer
 Erma Perham Proetz (1891–1944), American advertising executive and the first woman inducted into the Advertising Hall of Fame

Geography
Erma Knoll, a peak in upper Huron Glacier, Livingston Island, Antarctica
Erma, New Jersey, a census-designated place and unincorporated area
Erma Reka (village), a village in southern Bulgaria
Jerma (river) or Erma River, in southeastern Serbia and western Bulgaria

Literature
Erma (webtoon), an American webcomic series by Brandon Santiago

Acronym
Electronic Recording Machine, Accounting, an early computer technology
Environmental Response Management Application, a geographic Information System developed by the U.S. National Oceanic and Atmospheric Administration (NOAA)
Environmental Risk Management Authority, a former New Zealand government body
Erma Werke, Erfurter Maschinenfabrik B. Geipel GmbH, a now defunct German weapon manufacturer
Ernest Read Music Association, a group founded in honour of Ernest Read to encourage musical educational activities in the UK
Emergency Recovery Management Agreements, a temporary concession-based replacement for Passenger rail franchising in Great Britain from September 20th 2020

See also
Irma (disambiguation)